Trevor John Francis (born 19 April 1954) is an English former footballer who played as a forward for a number of clubs in England, the United States, Italy, Scotland and Australia. In 1979 he became Britain's first £1 million player following his transfer from Birmingham City to Nottingham Forest. He scored the winning goal for Forest in the 1979 European Cup final against Malmö. He won the European Cup again with the club the following year. At international level, he played for England 52 times between 1976 and 1986, scoring 12 goals, and played at the 1982 FIFA World Cup.

Between 1988 and 2003 he was a football manager, most notably with Sheffield Wednesday and Birmingham City. His final managerial post was at Crystal Palace, whom he left in 2003.

Early life and education
Francis was born in Plymouth, Devon, and educated at Plymouth's Public Secondary School for Boys. He was an agile and skilful forward and joined Birmingham City as a schoolboy.

Club career

Early career
Francis quickly rose in status, making his debut for Birmingham City's first team in 1970, aged just 16. His talent was noted when, before his 17th birthday, he scored four goals in a match against Bolton Wanderers. He ended his first season with 15 goals from just 22 games.

Birmingham City
In the 1970s, Birmingham City reached the occasional domestic semi-final but failed to make a great impact in the First Division championship, so the ability and achievements of Francis were made more noticeable as a result.

On 30 October 1976, he scored one of Birmingham's most famous goals, when he turned away from the touchline and cut inside two Queens Park Rangers defenders, constantly being forced backwards, before suddenly unleashing a 25-yard shot which caught the goalkeeper off guard.

Detroit Express (NASL)
Francis negotiated a secondment from Birmingham in 1978 to play for the Detroit Express in the North American Soccer League (NASL), where he scored 22 goals in 19 league matches and was named to the NASL first XI alongside Franz Beckenbauer and Giorgio Chinaglia before returning home to the Midlands. However, in February 1979 came the moment which would define his career and leave his name permanently in football folklore.

Nottingham Forest
Nottingham Forest, the reigning First Division champions and League Cup holders managed by Brian Clough, put in a bid for Francis which totalled just over £1 million. No player had ever been sold between English clubs for a seven-figure fee before (the erstwhile record was less than half), and the deal was sealed, with Francis famously being introduced to the media by a manager impatient to play squash; Clough was in his red gym kit and carrying a racquet as he addressed the press conference.

While recognised as the first British million-pound player, the actual transfer fee for the player was £1,150,000, including 15% commission to the Football League. Clough wrote in his autobiography that the fee was £999,999, as he wanted to ensure the million-pound milestone did not go to the player's head, although Francis says that was a tongue-in-cheek remark by Clough.

Nottingham Forest retained the League Cup shortly afterwards (though Francis was ineligible), and made progress in the European Cup to the extent that they reached the semi-finals, at which point Francis was permitted by registration rules to take part. They won their semi-final, and in May 1979 Forest took on Swedish club Malmö in the final in Munich, and a major instalment of the huge investment money was repaid just before half time.

The ball was spread to Forest's winger John Robertson wide on the left and he took on two defenders at once to reach the byline and curl an awkward, outswinging cross towards the far post. Francis had already begun to sprint into position, but even so he had to increase his pace in order to reach the cross as it dropped, and ended up throwing himself low at the ball. He connected with his head and the ball diverted powerfully into the roof of the net. Forest won the match 1–0 and footage of the goal was used in the opening titles to Match of the Day for some years afterwards. A giant picture of Francis stooping to head the ball remains on display in the main entrance and reception area of Forest's City Ground stadium.

Even though the season ended there, Francis duly headed back to Detroit for another summer playing in the NASL, where once again he was named to the first XI alongside Johan Cruyff (LA) and Giorgio Chinaglia (NY), despite playing only half the season. In his brief NASL career, Francis scored 36 goals in 33 regular season matches and had 18 assists, placing him one spot ahead of Pelé on the all-time scoring list, despite playing 23 fewer games.

Francis arguably did not achieve his full potential as a Forest player. This may partly be due to Clough frequently playing Francis on the right wing, rather than in his preferred position as a central attacker. He was in the side which lost the 1980 League Cup Final to Wolverhampton Wanderers, but missed the European Cup Final against Hamburg due to an injury to his Achilles tendon. Somehow the success of his Forest career never quite reflected his huge fee: he scored only 14 league goals in the 1979–80 season and 6 in the next 18 games that he played for Forest. Although still a regular for England, his Achilles injury prevented him being in the squad for the 1980 European Championships, his scoring record in club football was not spectacular.

Manchester City
The injury kept Francis out of the game for over six months. He was sold to Manchester City in September 1981, this time for £1.2 million. The deal caused behind-the-scenes friction at Manchester City. During negotiations City chairman Peter Swales informed manager John Bond that the club could not afford the transfer fee. Bond then issued an ultimatum: if Francis did not sign, Bond would resign. Francis made a promising start at the club, scoring two goals against Stoke City on his debut, but over the course of the season he was frequently injured. In total he scored 12 goals in 26 games and made the England squad for the 1982 World Cup.

Back at his club, financial problems were again an issue. Francis' contract gave him a salary of £100,000 plus bonuses, which the club could no longer afford to pay to a player who regularly sustained injuries. As a result, Francis was sold to Italian club Sampdoria.

Sampdoria
Later that summer, Francis was approached by Italian giants Sampdoria, who paid Manchester City £700,000 for his services. He helped win the 1984–85 Coppa Italia, in the same team as Scotland midfielder Graeme Souness. It was the first time that Sampdoria had won the competition.

Atalanta
Francis joined Atalanta for £800,000, where he played 21 times but scored only once.

Rangers
Francis returned to Britain in September 1987 to join Rangers under Graeme Souness, as part of his self-styled "English invasion" at Ibrox. Francis cost just £75,000 and won the 1987–88 Scottish League Cup, scoring a penalty in the shootout.

Queens Park Rangers
He signed as a player for Queens Park Rangers in March 1988 and took over as player-manager in November 1988 when Jim Smith moved to Newcastle United. He was replaced as manager by Don Howe in November 1989 after a year in charge, with the club in danger of relegation.

Sheffield Wednesday
Francis left QPR in February 1990 to play for Sheffield Wednesday; despite gaining a good reputation amongst supporters, he could not help the club avoid relegation to the second tier for the 1990–91 season. However, that season he helped Wednesday win the League Cup, although he was a non-playing substitute in the final, and also gain promotion back to the top flight.

International career
Francis played for England 52 times between 1977 and 1986 and scored 12 goals. In 1977, he was given his first England cap by Don Revie, in a 2–0 loss against the Netherlands. After missing out on Euro 1980 due to an Achilles injury, Francis was named in the England squad for the 1982 World Cup in Spain. In the first round of the tournament, he scored in the group games against Czechoslovakia and Kuwait. England were eliminated after two goalless draws against both the host nation and West Germany. In spring 1986, he made his 52nd and final appearance for England in a victory over Scotland, and was subsequently not selected for the 1986 World Cup in Mexico.

Managerial career

Sheffield Wednesday
After the departure of Ron Atkinson, Francis took over as manager of Sheffield Wednesday with popular support from club and supporters. He guided Wednesday to an excellent third-place finish in 1992. The following year, Wednesday reached the FA Cup and League Cup finals, losing both to Arsenal, the former after a replay. In 1994, Francis finally retired as a player, shortly before his 40th birthday. He was sacked as manager a year later after Wednesday finished 13th in the Premiership.

In February 1992, Francis brought former French international Eric Cantona back from the wilderness by inviting him for a trial at Sheffield Wednesday. However, as the snowy conditions meant that he could only evaluate Cantona on astroturf, Francis requested an extension to the trial to see whether Cantona could play on grass. An outraged Cantona walked out on The Owls and was signed (without a trial) by Leeds United, inspiring first them and then Manchester United to success. In a 2012 interview Francis said that he had agreed to take Cantona on as a favour to Francis' former agent, Dennis Roach, and Michel Platini, who he knew from his time playing in Italy, when they approached him about taking on Cantona, and that it was intended as an opportunity for Cantona to put himself in the "shop window": Wednesday had only recently been promoted back to the top flight, with most of the squad still being on Second Division-level wages, and the club could not afford to sign him.

Birmingham City
After leaving Wednesday, Francis spent time working as a television pundit (something which he had done throughout his career) before going back to his spiritual home of Birmingham City as manager in 1996, aiming to regain their position as a top team. They continued to reach the play-offs but failed to be promoted. They also lost the 2001 League Cup Final to Liverpool. Francis left later that year.

Crystal Palace
Francis had a spell in charge of Crystal Palace, from November 2001 to April 2003. Under his managership, Palace defeated Liverpool in an FA Cup fourth round replay at Anfield in February 2003 and beat Palace's main rivals Brighton 5–0 in October 2002.

Personal life
Francis married Helen in 1974. The couple had two children together. On 5 April 2017, it was reported that Helen Francis had died.

On 13 April 2012, Francis was reported to be recovering in hospital from a suspected heart attack.

Career statistics

Honours

Player
Birmingham City
Football League Second Division runner-up: 1971–72

Detroit Express
American Conference Central Division: 1978

Nottingham Forest
 European Cup: 1978–79, 1979–80
 European Super Cup: 1979
 Football League Cup: runner-up 1979–80

Sampdoria
Coppa Italia: 1984–85

Rangers
Scottish League Cup: 1987–88

Sheffield Wednesday
Football League Cup: 1990–91

Individual
PFA First Division Team of the Year: 1976–77, 1977–78, 1981–82
Coppa Italia top scorer: 1984–85 (9 goals)

Manager
Sheffield Wednesday
FA Cup runner-up: 1992–93
Football League Cup runner-up: 1992–93

Birmingham City
Football League Cup runner-up: 2000–01

Individual
Premier League Manager of the Month: December 1993

References

External links

1954 births
Living people
Footballers from Plymouth, Devon
English footballers
Footballers from Devon
England under-23 international footballers
England international footballers
Association football forwards
Birmingham City F.C. players
Detroit Express players
Nottingham Forest F.C. players
Manchester City F.C. players
U.C. Sampdoria players
Atalanta B.C. players
Rangers F.C. players
Wollongong Wolves FC players
Queens Park Rangers F.C. players
Sheffield Wednesday F.C. players
English Football League players
North American Soccer League (1968–1984) players
Serie A players
Scottish Football League players
National Soccer League (Australia) players
Premier League players
UEFA Champions League winning players
1982 FIFA World Cup players
English Football Hall of Fame inductees
Association football player-managers
English football managers
Queens Park Rangers F.C. managers
Sheffield Wednesday F.C. managers
Birmingham City F.C. managers
Crystal Palace F.C. managers
English Football League managers
Premier League managers
English association football commentators
English expatriate footballers
English expatriate sportspeople in the United States
English expatriate sportspeople in Italy
English expatriate sportspeople in Australia
Expatriate soccer players in the United States
Expatriate footballers in Italy
Expatriate soccer players in Australia